Penicillium persicinum is a species of fungus in the genus Penicillium which was isolated from soil from the Qinghai Province in China. Penicillium persicinum produces griseofulvin, lichexanthone, roquefortine C, roquefortine D, patulin and chrysogine

References

Further reading 
 
 

persicinum
Fungi described in 2004